Kupa Synagogue is a 17th-century synagogue in Kraków, Poland. It is located in the former Jewish quarter of Kazimierz developed from a neighborhood earmarked in 1495 by King John I Albert (Polish: Jan I Olbracht) for the Jewish community, which has been transferred from the budding Old Town. Kupa Synagogue serves Kraków's Jewish community as one of the venues for religious ceremonies and cultural festivals, notably the annual Jewish Culture Festival in Kraków.

History 
The Synagogue was founded in 1643 by the Kazimierz Jewish district's kehilla (a municipal form of self-government), as a foundation of the local qahal. A contribution of 200 zlotys by the Jewish goldsmiths' guild helped to bring the construction to its successful completion. The Synagogue was built in a baroque style with a square prayer hall inside. The building underwent many renovations throughout the centuries. In 1830-1834 the two-storey annex was added with entrance hall and washrooms. In 1861 the western wing was built. At the end of the 19th century, the synagogue was joined with the adjacent building. The synagogue was burned down by a Polish mob during the Kraków pogrom, shortly after the end of World War II, and  has been meticulously restored since. Its northern wall connects with the remnants of the medieval city-wall of Kazimerz while its southern flank faces Warchauera Street. The colorful interior of the Kupa Synagogue serves as an exhibition hall and the venue for musical events.

The Synagogue is richly decorated with paintings from the 1920s featured on walls, the ceiling and in the women's section. The depictions include the holy places of Hebron, Tiberias, and Jerusalem. There are also Biblical scenes and illustrations to verses in Psalms, such as the painting showing people standing by the rivers of Babylon, or musical instruments. Another painting depicts Noah's ark including the figure of Noah – quite unusual since the use of human images was very rare in Jewish art. The signs of the Zodiac are painted over the women's gallery. The artist, although unidentified, was clearly professional. There are also remnants of earlier paintings from the 17th to 18th centuries. The older drawings are ornamental, with leaves and fruit surrounding texts. A carved wood and stucco Torah Ark, from the early 17th century, adorns the interior.

See also
History of Jews in Poland

Notes

References

"Old Kleparz" at Poland: What Where When
Marek Strzala, Synagogues of the Kazimierz district
Aneta Kalemba, Poland: Online presentation
Steven Spielberg's Righteous Persons' Foundation, "Exploring the Synagogues of Poland" from the Internet Archive
The Jewish Community of Krakow

External links
 
  Virtual tour at YouTube.com

Religious buildings and structures completed in 1643
Former synagogues in Poland
Synagogues in Kraków
17th-century synagogues
1643 establishments in the Polish–Lithuanian Commonwealth
Baroque synagogues in Poland